Mukerian railway station is located in Hoshiarpur district in the Indian state of Punjab and serves Mukerian .

The railway station

History
The line from Jalandhar City to Mukerian city was constructed in 1915. The Mukerian–Pathankot line was built in 1952. The construction of the Pathankot–Jammu Tawi line was initiated in 1965, after the Indo-Pakistani War of 1965, and opened in 1971.

Electrification
Electrification work of the Jalandhar–Jammu line is on. As of 2010–11, around 100 km had been electrified. As of 2013, electrification was expected to be completed in about a year.

References

External links
 Trains at Mukerian

Railway stations in Hoshiarpur district
Firozpur railway division